"I Wanna Hear It from Your Lips" is a 1984 hit song by Eric Carmen.  It was the lead single from his sixth album, which was his second eponymous album.

The song reached number 35 on the Billboard Hot 100 during February 1985, becoming his sixth of eight Top 40 singles during his solo career. The song was a bigger adult contemporary hit, reaching number 10 in the United States and number 17 in Canada.

Charts

Cover versions
In 1986, Louise Mandrell recorded a country version of "I Wanna Hear It from Your Lips". Her rendition reached number 35 on the US country chart, and number 41 on the Canadian country chart.

References

1985 songs
1985 singles
Eric Carmen songs
Louise Mandrell songs
Songs written by Eric Carmen
Songs written by Dean Pitchford
Geffen Records singles
Song recordings produced by Bob Gaudio